The Ohio Kings Island Open was a golf tournament on the PGA Tour from 1973 to 1977. It was played at Jack Nicklaus Golf Center in Mason, Ohio. The tournament was dropped when the LPGA Championship moved there in 1978.

Tournament highlights
1973: Jack Nicklaus shoots a third round 62 on his way to a six-shot victory over Lee Trevino in the inaugural version of the tournament. After the tournament was over, Nicklaus announced he would be giving all of his first place check, $25,000, to charity.
1974: Miller Barber notches a victory for the eighth consecutive year. His 72-hole total of 277 is good enough for a three shot win over George Johnson.
1976: Ben Crenshaw sinks a 14-foot birdie putt on the 72nd hole to beat Andy North by one shot.
1977: Mike Hill wins the last edition of the tournament by one shot over Tom Kite.

Winners

References

External links
Results on golfstats.com

Former PGA Tour events
Golf in Ohio
Recurring sporting events established in 1973
Recurring sporting events disestablished in 1977
1973 establishments in Ohio
1977 disestablishments in Ohio